Planet Jedward is the debut studio album by Irish pop duo Jedward. The album was released on 16 July 2010.  The album charted at No. 1 in Ireland and No. 17 in the UK. Critical reaction was largely negative.

Background
The album was released via Absolute Records, a minor subsidiary of the Universal Music Group label. However, the twins' debut single, "Under Pressure (Ice Ice Baby)", had been released by Sony Music. The album itself consists entirely of cover versions.

Following the duo's Eurovision success in May 2011, a version of Planet Jedward was released across Europe in July, mainly consisting of previously unheard tracks from the duo's second studio album, Victory. This version of the album also included their Eurovision Song Contest 2011 entry, "Lipstick".

In 2010, the original album was certified double platinum in Ireland, meaning that between 30,000 and 44,999 copies had been sold in the country as of the date of the certification. In the UK, the album had sold 31,251 copies as of August 2011.

Critical reception 

The album was received extremely negatively by critics. The Guardian's Caroline Sullivan said "it would be stretching a point to say I'd ever want to hear it again." Virgin Media criticised the "painfully wooden dialogue before the layers of auto-tuned backing vocalists kick in." The Scotsman called it "a 35-minute comedy of errors". Digital Spy said it "contains more crimes against music than the combined discographies of The Cheeky Girls, Phil Collins and Lou Bega." The duo's compatriot newspaper Irish Independent were unsympathetic and declared "Burn it: In the traditional sense of the word, burn the entire thing." OK! magazine said it was "all very karaoke and never going to win any awards, but it's fun. To sum up, Planet Jedward is great for a short visit but we're not sure we'd want to live there!"

Track listing

Chart performance

References

Jedward albums
2010 debut albums
Universal Music Group albums
Covers albums